Spirit of Peace is the fifteenth album by Popol Vuh. It was originally released in 1985 on Cicada. The first track was used by Werner Herzog as original motion picture soundtrack for his documentary The Dark Glow of the Mountains (original title "Gasherbrum – Der leuchtende Berg") about Reinhold Messner.

Track listing 
All tracks composed by Florian Fricke except where noted.

 "We Know About the Need" – 4:20
 "Spirit of Peace" – 7:00
 "Song of Earth" – 8:07
 "Take the Tention High" (Fricke, Daniel Fichelscher) – 17:27

Personnel 
 Florian Fricke – piano, vocals
 Daniel Fichelscher – acoustic guitar
 Renate Knaup – vocals

Guest musicians
 Conny Veit – E-guitar
 Bernd Wippich – E-guitar

Credits 
Recorded at Quadrat Studio, Munich, March - June 1985 
Recorded and mixed by Bernd Wippich 
Produced by Florian Fricke and Popol Vuh

Cover concept by Florian Fricke 
Cover design by Tormod Opedal and Erik Wollo

Liner notes 

Words:
Yehung
Hand in Hand

External links 

http://www.furious.com/perfect/populvuh.html (Comprehensive article & review of every album, in English)
https://web.archive.org/web/20080119183122/http://www.enricobassi.it/popvuhdiscografia80.htm (featuring the original credits)
http://www.venco.com.pl/~acrux/spirit.htm

Popol Vuh (band) albums
1985 albums